Thomas Luke Msusa, S.M.M. (born 2 February 1962) is archbishop of the Roman Catholic Archdiocese of Blantyre in Malawi. He is a convert to the Catholic Church from Islam.

Life
He is the son of a Muslim imam and at the age of seven left his village to study. He converted to the Catholic Church and was baptized at the age of twelve and after this entered the seminary, facing opposition of his family due to his conversion. Upon his return, he was rejected by his family except his uncle, himself a convert to the Catholic Church.

On 3 August 1996, Msusa was ordained to priesthood in the Company of Mary. His appointment as Catholic bishop was on 19 December 2003 by Pope John Paul II and on 17 April 2004 was ordained bishop to the Roman Catholic Diocese of Zomba by Orlando Antonini, with the principal co-consecrators being Tarcisius Gervazio Ziyaye, Archbishop of Blantyre, and Allan Chamgwera, bishop emeritus of Zomba.

After his ordination to the episcopate, his father asked him to enter himself also within the Catholic Church and Monsignor Msusa then baptised him in 2006 after he attended a catechetical instruction.

On 21 November 2013 he was appointed to the Roman Catholic Archdiocese of Blantyre and on 8 February 2014 was installed on the archbishopric. In 2015, he was appointed vice president of the association of eight members of the Episcopal Conferences of Eastern Africa and participated in the Fourteenth Ordinary General Assembly of the Synod of Bishops.

References

External links

 http://www.catholic-hierarchy.org/bishop/bmsusa.html

1962 births
Living people
Converts to Roman Catholicism from Islam
Malawian former Muslims
Malawian Roman Catholic archbishops
Roman Catholic bishops of Zomba
Roman Catholic archbishops of Blantyre